The Ondřejov Observatory is the principal observatory of the Astronomical Institute of the Academy of Sciences of the Czech Republic.

History
The facility was constructed in 1898, by Czech amateur astronomer and entrepreneur Josef Jan Frič as a private observatory. On 28 October 1928, he donated the facility to the Czechoslovak state to celebrate the tenth anniversary of its independence.

Now it is the largest telescope in the Czech Republic and is in the second hundred in the world.

It has been responsible, among other scientific achievements, for the discovery of numerous asteroids; more recent works of astronomers from Ondřejov include examination of the trajectory and origin of the Chelyabinsk meteor. More than 700 minor planets have been discovered at this observatory. While most of these discoveries are officially credited to the astronomers who discovered them, a remaining 23 minor planets are directly credited to "Ondrejov" (the observatory itself) by the Minor Planet Center for the period 1997–2008.

The main-belt asteroid 7204 Ondřejov, discovered by Petr Pravec in 1995, was named for the village where the observatory is located.

List of discovered minor planets

Gallery

See also 
 Astronomical Institute of Czech Academy of Sciences
 List of asteroid-discovering observatories
 List of astronomical observatories
 
 List of observatory codes

References

External links 
 
 Astronomical Institute, responsible for the observatory
 Photos of the observatory
 News from Ondřejov Photometric Program
 Numbered asteroids discovered at Ondřejov, 1 June 2018

1898 establishments in Austria-Hungary
Astronomical observatories in the Czech Republic

Minor-planet discovering observatories
Buildings and structures in Prague-East District